State Road 76 (NM 76) is a state highway in the US state of New Mexico. NM 76's western terminus is at NM 68 in Santa Cruz  and the eastern terminus is in Picuris Pueblo at NM 75.

History
Father Casimiro Roca served the community of Chimayó, and had a large part in caring for and helping restore the Santuario de Chimayó.

Major intersections

See also

 List of state roads in New Mexico

References

External links

076
Transportation in Santa Fe County, New Mexico
Transportation in Rio Arriba County, New Mexico
Transportation in Taos County, New Mexico